Clondalkin Round Tower is an Irish round tower or cloigtheach founded by Saint Mochua, also known as Saint Cronan, and located in Clondalkin, South Dublin, Ireland. It is now a National Monument of Ireland. It's also become a museum that houses a cafe.

Location
Clondalkin Round Tower is located in central Clondalkin, South Dublin, south of the River Camac.

History
Clondalkin Round Tower is built on the site of a monastery founded by Saint Mochua/Cronan  in the 7th century. It is one of only four remaining in County Dublin, the others being located in Swords, Lusk and Rathmichael.

The Viking King Olaf the White built a fort here in AD 852. The monastery was plundered in 832 and 866.

Amlaíb Conung (d. 874) built a fortress on the site in the middle of the 9th century. In 867 a force led by Cennétig mac Gaíthéne, king of Loígis, burned the fortress at Clondalkin and killed 100 of Amlaíb’s followers. The district remained under Danish control until the Viking defeat by Brian Boru at the famous Battle of Clontarf in 1014. Clondalkin witnessed another historic event during the Norman invasion of Ireland when there was a battle there between Richard de Clare (Strongbow) and the High King of Ireland Ruaidrí Ua Conchobair. The tower has recently become a museum and a "restaurant" named East Village Cafe.

Description
Built on the site of a monastery founded by Saint Mochua in the 7th century AD, the Irish round tower at Clondalkin is one of four remaining towers in County Dublin, the other three are located at Swords, Lusk and Rathmichael. The drum is also extremely narrow, the diameter being only  metres at its widest point. A most unusual feature of this tower is the very pronounced buttress at the base of the tower. This buttress is constructed of a different variety of stone to the main tower, which may suggest it was added later.

At present there is a series of steps cut into the buttress in the late 19th century, winding around the buttress leading up  to the base of the east facing doorway. Granite stones were used for the jambs, sill and lintel of the doorway.

The most unusual feature of this tower is the very pronounced buttress at the base which is constructed with a different type of stone to the tower. The series of steps was believed to be added to the buttress in the late 19th century. There are 6 windows in the tower, and the top 4 of them point north, south, east and west.

The bulging base is rubblework with smaller stones. The very plain lintelled doorway is composed mainly of granite. There are four square-headed windows in the top storey facing the cardinal compass points. Two other windows in the drum face south (in the first storey) and west (in the second storey). Both are also square-headed.

Crosses
There are two stone crosses. The smaller depicts both a ringed and a Latin cross on its faces, while the larger granite cross, which may have originally been a boundary or grave marker, stands proudly a few metres apart from the smaller cross. Along the boundary to the right of the new church is a large granite baptismal font which may date back to the original monastic times.

References

National Monuments in County Dublin
Towers in the Republic of Ireland